The Minnesota Senate, District 12 is one of 67 Minnesota State Senate districts. It encompasses parts of Big Stone County, Douglas County, Grant County, Pope County, Stearns County, Stevens County, Swift County, Traverse County and Wilkin County. The seat has been held by Republican Torrey Westrom of Elbow Lake, Minnesota since 2013.

List of senators

References 

Minnesota Senate districts
Big Stone County, Minnesota
Douglas County, Minnesota
Grant County, Minnesota
Pope County, Minnesota
Stearns County, Minnesota
Stevens County, Minnesota
Swift County, Minnesota
Traverse County, Minnesota
Wilkin County, Minnesota